Gambrills refers to two neighboring places in Anne Arundel County, Maryland, United States, located in the Annapolis metro area: the unincorporated community of Gambrills, and the Gambrills census-designated place (CDP). The area was named after Augustine Gambrill, plantation owner. The CDP covers an expansive range that falls within the communities of Crofton, Waugh Chapel, and Odenton. It also borders Davidsonville, Crownsville, Millersville, and Prince George's County, Maryland.  In 2022, the population of the CDP was 2,837. The median-income of residents was $140,238. Gambrills is served by routes 3, 32 and MARC, the Maryland commuter rail service. There is a MARC station in the neighboring town of Odenton.

Geography

Demographics

Retail
Gambrills is the site of two large power centers adjacent to one another: Waugh Chapel Towne Centre (650,000 sq. ft.) part of a 1.2 million square foot mixed-use development, and the Village at Waugh Chapel (357,000 square feet).

Schools
The area is served by the following schools:
 Crofton Elementary School (Crofton, Maryland)
 Crofton Woods Elementary School (Crofton, Maryland)
 Crofton Meadows Elementary School (Crofton, Maryland)
 Millersville Elementary School (Millersville, Maryland)
 Nantucket Elementary School ((Crofton, Maryland))
 Four Seasons Elementary School (Gambrills, Maryland)
 Odenton Elementary School (Odenton, Maryland)
 Waugh Chapel Elementary School (Odenton, Maryland)
School of the Incarnation (Gambrills, Maryland)
Crofton Middle School (Gambrills, Maryland)
Arundel Middle School (Odenton, Maryland)
Old Mill Middle School South (Millersville)
Arundel High School (Gambrills, Maryland)
Crofton High School (Gambrills, Maryland)
 Old Mill High School (Millersville)

References

Census-designated places in Maryland
Census-designated places in Anne Arundel County, Maryland